Malpractice is the fifth studio album by rapper Redman. Originally scheduled to be released on December 12, 2000, the album was then delayed to April 17, 2001. The album was ultimately released on May 22, 2001. It reached number four on US Billboard 200 and was certified gold by the RIAA on July 21, 2001. To date, the album has sold 683,000 copies. It boasted two singles: "Let's Get Dirty (I Can't Get in da Club)" and "Smash Something."

Commercial performance
Malpractice debuted at number four on the US Billboard 200 chart, selling 148,000 copies in its first week, becoming Redman's first US top ten album as a solo act and marks his highest first-week sales. On June 21, 2001, the album was certified gold by the Recording Industry Association of America (RIAA) for sales of over 500,000 copies. As of October 2009, the album has 686,000 copies in the United States.

Track listing

Samples
Diggy Doc
"The D.O.C. & The Doctor" by The D.O.C.
Muh-Fu**a
"Soul Train" by The Manhattans
Dat *****
"Devils Gun" by C. J. & Company
Doggz II
"Get At Me Dog" by DMX
"Atomic Dog" by Parliament
Superman Lover 5 Pt.1
"He's A Fly Guy" by Curtis Mayfield
Lick A Shot
"Change Like the Weather" by Bounty Killer

Album singles

Charts

Weekly charts

Year-end charts

Singles

Certifications

References

2001 albums
Redman (rapper) albums
Def Jam Recordings albums
Albums produced by Erick Sermon
Albums produced by Saukrates